Cirtsville is an unincorporated community located  in Raleigh County, West Virginia, United States.
The community derives its name from Curt Vass, an early settler.

References 

Unincorporated communities in West Virginia
Unincorporated communities in Raleigh County, West Virginia